Andrézieux-Bouthéon Football Club is a French association football team founded in 1947. Prior to July 2019 they were known by the name L'Association Sportive Forezienne Andrézieux-Bouthéon. They are based in Andrézieux-Bouthéon, Rhône-Alpes, France and are currently playing in the Championnat National 2, the fourth tier in the French football league system. They play at the L'Envol Stadium in Andrézieux-Bouthéon, inaugurated in 2016, which has a capacity of 5,000. Previously, they had played at Stade Roger Baudras.

On 6 January 2019, the club beat Ligue 1 club Olympique de Marseille 2–0 in the round of 64 in the Coupe de France.

Current squad

Season-by-Season

References

External links
 

Football clubs in France
Association football clubs established in 1947
1947 establishments in France
Sport in Loire (department)